Knischatiria is a genus of dwarf spiders that was first described by J. Wunderlich in 1976.  it contains only three species, found in Australia, Indonesia, and Malaysia: K. abnormis, K. longispina, and K. tuberosa.

See also
 List of Linyphiidae species (I–P)

References

Araneomorphae genera
Linyphiidae
Spiders of Asia
Spiders of Australia